Anna Pogany (born 21 July 1994 in Berlin) is a German volleyball player.

Career 
She participated in the  2017 FIVB Volleyball World Grand Prix, and the 2018 FIVB Volleyball Women's Nations League.

References

External links 
 FIVB profile
 CEV profile
 

1994 births
Living people
German women's volleyball players
Volleyball players from Berlin